Nilgiricola is a genus of moths in the subfamily Arctiinae. It contains the single species Nilgiricola sicciana, which is found in India (Madras).

References

Natural History Museum Lepidoptera generic names catalog

Lithosiini